Jean-Baptiste-Camille Corot (1796–1875) was a French landscape painter.

Corot may also refer to:

 COROT, a space mission with the dual aims of finding extrasolar planets and performing asteroseismology
 COROT-7, a dwarf star in the Monoceros constellation
 Corot noir, a hybrid grape

See also
Carat (disambiguation)